Strength training or resistance training involves the performance of physical exercises that are designed to improve strength and endurance. It is often associated with the lifting of weights. It can also incorporate a variety of training techniques such as bodyweight exercises, isometrics, and plyometrics.

Training works by progressively increasing the force output of the muscles and uses a variety of exercises and types of equipment. Strength training is primarily an anaerobic activity, although circuit training also is a form of aerobic exercise. 

Strength training can increase muscle, tendon, and ligament strength as well as bone density, metabolism, and the lactate threshold; improve joint and cardiac function; and reduce the risk of injury in athletes and the elderly. For many sports and physical activities, strength training is central or is used as part of their training regimen.

Principles and training methods 
The basic principles of strength training involve repeated overloading of a group of muscles, typically by contracting the muscles under heavy resistance and returning to the start position for several repetitions until failure. The basic method of resistance training uses the principle of progressive overload, in which the muscles are overloaded by working against as high resistance as they are capable of. They respond by growing larger and stronger. 
Beginning strength-trainers are in the process of training the neurological aspects of strength, the ability of the brain to generate a rate of neuronal action potentials that will produce a muscular contraction that is close to the maximum of the muscle's potential.

Intensity, volume, and frequency 
Three important variables of strength training are intensity, volume, and frequency. Intensity is the amount of work required to achieve the activity and is often measured by the percentage of an individual's one-repetition maximum (1RM). The intensity limits the number of repetitions that can be carried out in one set, and is correlated with the repetition ranges chosen, traditionally divided as follows:
1 to 5 repetitions per set at 80% to 100% of 1RM—heavy, may have an advantage in strength development
8 to 12 repetitions per set with 60% to 80% of 1RM—moderate, traditionally thought to maximize hypertrophy, although more recent research has shown that hypertrophy can be maximized with a wide range loading schemes equal or greater than 30% 1RM of assuming the set is taken to failure.
15+ repetitions per set with loads below 60% of 1RM—light, traditionally recommended to increase endurance

Volume refers to the total number of muscles worked, exercises, sets, and reps, either during a single session or measured over a longer period. Frequency refers to how many training sessions are performed per week. A training frequency of two times per week has greater effect on muscle size than once per week. Whether training a muscle group three times per week is superior to a twice-per-week protocol remains to be determined. Training volume has more effect on muscle strength than training frequency.

A common training strategy is to set the volume and frequency the same each week (e.g. training 3 times per week, with 2 sets of 12 reps each workout), and steadily increase the resistance on a weekly basis. However, to maximize progress to specific goals, individual programs may require different manipulations, such as decreasing the resistance, and increase volume or frequency.

Periodization
A meta-analysis found that periodized training yields better strength improvements than non-periodized training. Making program alterations on a daily basis (daily undulating periodization) has similar effect to other periodization models.

Training Splits 
A training split refers to how the trainee divides and schedules their training volume, or in other words which muscles are trained on a given day over a period of time (usually a week). Popular training splits include full body, upper/lower, push/pull/legs, and the "bro" split. Some training programs may alternate splits weekly.

Equipment
Commonly used equipment for resistance training include free weights—including dumbbells, barbells, and kettlebells—weight machines, and resistance bands. Some bodyweight exercises do not require any equipment, and others may be performed with equipment such as suspension trainers or pull-up bars.

Aerobic exercise versus anaerobic exercise 

Strength training exercise is primarily anaerobic. Even while training at a lower intensity (training loads of ~20-RM), anaerobic glycolysis is still the major source of power, although aerobic metabolism makes a small contribution. Weight training is commonly perceived as anaerobic exercise, because one of the more common goals is to increase strength by lifting heavy weights. Other goals such as rehabilitation, weight loss, body shaping, and bodybuilding often use lower weights, adding aerobic character to the exercise.

Except in the extremes, a muscle will fire fibres of both the aerobic or anaerobic types on any given exercise, in varying ratio depending on the load on the intensity of the contraction. This is known as the energy system continuum. At higher loads, the muscle will recruit all muscle fibres possible, both anaerobic ("fast-twitch") and aerobic ("slow-twitch"), to generate the most force. However, at maximum load, the anaerobic processes contract so forcefully that the aerobic fibers are completely shut out, and all work is done by the anaerobic processes. Because the anaerobic muscle fibre uses its fuel faster than the blood and intracellular restorative cycles can resupply it, the maximum number of repetitions is limited. In the aerobic regime, the blood and intracellular processes can maintain a supply of fuel and oxygen, and continual repetition of the motion will not cause the muscle to fail.

Circuit weight training is a form of exercise that uses a number of weight training exercise sets separated by short intervals. The cardiovascular effort to recover from each set serves a function similar to an aerobic exercise, but this is not the same as saying that a weight training set is itself an aerobic process.

Strength training is typically associated with the production of lactate, which is a limiting factor of exercise performance. Regular endurance exercise leads to adaptations in skeletal muscle which can prevent lactate levels from rising during strength training. This is mediated via activation of PGC-1alpha which alter the LDH (lactate dehydrogenase) isoenzyme complex composition and decreases the activity of the lactate generating enzyme LDHA, while increasing the activity of the lactate metabolizing enzyme LDHB.

Nutrition and supplementation 

A 2018 systematic review found that supplementation of protein in the diet of healthy adults increased the size and strength of muscles during prolonged resistance exercise training; protein intakes of greater than 1.6 g/kg/day did not additionally increase fat-free mass or muscle size or strength. It is not known how much carbohydrate is necessary to maximize muscle hypertrophy. Strength adaptations may not be hindered by a low-carbohydrate diet.

A light, balanced meal prior to the workout (usually one to two hours beforehand) ensures that adequate energy and amino acids are available for the intense bout of exercise. The type of nutrients consumed affects the response of the body, and nutrient timing whereby protein and carbohydrates are consumed prior to and after workout has a beneficial impact on muscle growth. Water is consumed throughout the course of the workout to prevent poor performance due to dehydration. A protein shake is often consumed immediately following the workout. Glucose (or another simple sugar) is often consumed as well since this quickly replenishes any glycogen lost during the exercise period.
If consuming recovery drink after a workout, to maximize muscle protein anabolism, it is suggested that the recovery drink contain glucose (dextrose), protein (usually whey) hydrolysate containing mainly dipeptides and tripeptides, and leucine.

Some weight trainers also take ergogenic aids such as creatine or anabolic steroids to aid muscle growth.

Effects 
The effects of strength training include greater muscular strength, improved muscle tone and appearance, increased endurance, cardiovascular health, and enhanced bone density.

Bones, joints, frailty, posture and in people at risk
Strength training also provides functional benefits. Stronger muscles improve posture, provide better support for joints, and reduce the risk of injury from everyday activities.

Progressive resistance training may improve function, quality of life and reduce pain in people at risk of fracture, with rare adverse effects Weight-bearing exercise also helps to prevent osteoporosis and to improve bone strength in those with osteoporosis. For many people in rehabilitation or with an acquired disability, such as following stroke or orthopaedic surgery, strength training for weak muscles is a key factor to optimise recovery.

Mortality, longevity, muscle and body composition
A scientific review indicates that, based on mostly observational studies, strength training appears to be associated with a "10–17% lower risk of all-cause mortality, cardiovascular disease (CVD), total cancer, diabetes and lung cancer". Two key outcomes of strength training are muscle hypertrophy and muscular strength gain which are associated with reduced all-cause mortality.

Strength training causes endocrine responses that could have positive effects. It also reduces blood pressure (SBP and DBP) and alters body composition, reducing body fat percentage, body fat mass and visceral fat, which is usually beneficial as obesity predisposes towards several chronic diseases and e.g. body fat distribution is one predictor of insulin resistance and related complications.

Neurobiological effects
Strength training also leads to various beneficial neurobiological effects – likely including functional brain changes, lower white matter atrophy, neuroplasticity (including some degree of BDNF expression), and white matter-related structural and functional changes in neuroanatomy. Although resistance training has been less studied for its effect on depression than aerobic exercise, it has shown benefits compared to no intervention.

Lipid and inflammatory outcomes
Moreover, it also promotes decreases in total cholesterol (TC), triglycerides (TG), low-density lipoprotein (LDL), and C-reactive protein (CRP) as well as increases in high-density lipoprotein (HDL) and adiponectin concentrations.

Sports performance 
Stronger muscles improve performance in a variety of sports. Sport-specific training routines are used by many competitors. These often specify that the speed of muscle contraction during weight training should be the same as that of the particular sport. Strength training can substantially prevent sports injuries.

History 

Until the 20th century, the history of strength training was very similar to the history of weight training. With the advent of modern technology, materials and knowledge, the methods that can be used for strength training have multiplied significantly.

Hippocrates explained the principle behind strength training when he wrote "that which is used develops, and that which is not used wastes away", referring to muscular hypertrophy and atrophy. Progressive resistance training dates back at least to Ancient Greece, when legend has it that wrestler Milo of Croton trained by carrying a newborn calf on his back every day until it was fully grown. Another Greek, the physician Galen, described strength training exercises using the halteres (an early form of dumbbell) in the 2nd century. Ancient Persians used the meels, which became popular during the 19th century as the Indian club, and has recently made a comeback in the form of the clubbell.

The dumbbell was joined by the barbell in the latter half of the 19th century. Early barbells had hollow globes that could be filled with sand or lead shot, but by the end of the century these were replaced by the plate-loading barbell commonly used today.

Strength training with isometric exercise was popularised by Charles Atlas from the 1930s onwards. The 1960s saw the gradual introduction of exercise machines into the still-rare strength training gyms of the time. Strength training became increasingly popular in the 1980s following the release of the bodybuilding movie Pumping Iron and the subsequent popularity of Arnold Schwarzenegger.

Subpopulations

Sex differences 
Men and women have similar reactions to resistance training with comparable effect sizes for hypertrophy and lower body strength, although some studies have found that women experience a greater relative increase in upper-body strength. Because of their greater starting strength and muscle mass, absolute gains are higher in men. In older adults, a systematic review found that women experienced a larger increase in lower-body strength.

Safety concerns related to children 
Orthopaedic specialists used to recommend that children avoid weight training because the growth plates on their bones might be at risk. The very rare reports of growth plate fractures in children who trained with weights occurred as a result of inadequate supervision, improper form or excess weight, and there have been no reports of injuries to growth plates in youth training programs that followed established guidelines. The position of the National Strength and Conditioning Association is that strength training is safe for children if properly designed and supervised. Younger children are at greater risk of injury than adults if they drop a weight on themselves or perform an exercise incorrectly; further, they may lack understanding of, or ignore the safety precautions around weight training equipment. As a result, supervision of minors is considered vital to ensuring the safety of any youth engaging in strength training.

Older adults 
Aging is associated with a decrease in muscle mass and strength. Resistance training can mitigate this effect, and even the oldest old (those above age 85) can increase their muscle mass with a resistance training program, although to a lesser degree than younger individuals. With more strength older adults have better health, better quality of life, better physical function and fewer falls. Resistance training can improve physical functioning in older people, including the performance of activities of daily living. Resistance training programs are safe for older adults, can be adapted for mobility and disability limitations, and may be used in assisted living settings.

References 

 
Physical exercise
Bodybuilding
Anaerobic exercise

ang:Ȝearƿung (indryhtu)#Strengþuȝearƿung
cs:Posilování
de:Krafttraining
fr:Musculation